Wildau is a German town of the state of Brandenburg, located in the district of Dahme-Spreewald. It is located close to Berlin and easily reached by the S-Bahn. As of 2019 its population was 10,404 inhabitants.

History

The history of Wildau began with fisherman's families that settled by the Dahme River and then came to deliver sand, gravel and bricks from the region by boat to Berlin.

Mechanical engineering put Wildau on the map as a location for industry. In 1897, the company Schwartzkopff GmbH established a locomotive factory here, and built housing for the factory workers that is today is under cultural heritage management. During the Second World War, local factories were involved in armaments production. After the war, they became East Germany's state enterprise in heavy engineering. After German unification, the factories were mostly shut down by the Treuhand.

In the region around Wildau, numerous technology and business parks have been set up in recent years, with service industries, logistics centers, as well as energy and environmental technology companies. An engineering school founded in 1949, was an integral part of mechanical engineering in the region before 1990. In 1991 the federal state of Brandenburg founded the Technical University of Applied Sciences Wildau. In 2013 Wildau acquired the title of city and now is one of 113 other such small cities in Brandenburg.

Demography

Personalities who are associated with the city

 Walter Lehweß-Litzmann (1907–1986), Luftwaffe and NVA officer, later director of flight operations of Interflug, died in Wildau
 Willi Stoph (1914–1999), politician (SED), longtime chairman of the Council of Ministers of the GDR, is buried in the forest cemetery

References

External links
Website of TFH Wildau
Website of Wildau Institute of Technology

Localities in Dahme-Spreewald
Teltow (region)